Adrenaline Rush Project (ARP) is a nonprofit organization that provides opportunities for people with physical disabilities to participate in extreme sports. It was founded in 2012 through the joint efforts of nine college students. Its stated mission is: "To give people with physical disabilities the opportunities to participate in adrenaline-inducing activities that reaffirm in them the joy of being alive."

In order to qualify for a program, the participant must be 18 years of age or older. The participant's physician decides if a participant is eligible then medically clears a participant for the desired ARP program.

History
Adrenaline Rush Project was founded on August 26, 2012, in Berkeley, California by Daniel Conboy, Christopher Edgar, Min Jae Kim, Samuel Kim, Nicholas McHugh, Virginia McMahon, Eleanor Mullard, Dylan Ryan and Remy Tabano. The founders believed participation in so-called "extreme sports" could have a therapeutic effect on those with physical disabilities and founded ARP with the goal of sponsoring programs that would introduce such sports to selected participants.

Legal Status
Adrenaline Rush Project incorporated in California as a nonprofit public benefit corporation on September 17, 2012. It was approved for addition to the California Attorney General's Registry of Charitable Trusts on December 5, 2012, and is currently awaiting IRS exemption as a 501(c)(3) charitable organization.

Collegiate Chapters
The first university-based chapter of ARP was founded at UC Berkeley on October 29, 2012. Collegiate chapters are currently active at Berklee, Delaware, Duke, FIU, Michigan, Occidental, Pacific, UC Berkeley and Wash. U.

ARP plans to continue expansion onto various college and university campuses throughout the United States.

Programs
The Programs page on the ARP website displays information regarding programs offered through Adrenaline Rush Project which are skydives and NASCAR ride-alongs.

Skydiving
ARP sponsors skydiving for program participants at United States Parachute Association (USPA) Group Member drop zones. USPA is the United States' self-governing body for skydiving, and USPA Group Member DZs are required to 
use current USPA-rated instructors and USPA-required skydiving equipment. Skydiving was the first program the founders decided to offer because despite skydiving's increasingly safe track record, very few Americans participate in the sport. USPA estimates there were 3.1 million jumps in the United States in 2012, and the United States Census Bureau estimates there were 313.9 million people in the United States in 2012. This amounts to about 1 jump for every 101 people, or roughly 1% of the population. As many skydivers make several jumps over the course of a year, this percentage is likely much lower.

Though it currently only offers tandem jumps, ARP is considering offering its program alumni sponsorship of S/L, IAD or AFF programs towards earning a USPA A License (basic skydiving license).

NASCAR Ride-Alongs
ARP sponsors NASCAR ride-alongs for program participants through the Richard Petty Driving Experience and Rusty Wallace Racing Experience.

Financial information
Adrenaline Rush Project has not yet been required to file an IRS Form 990 but has a policy of making each form 990 available on its website within 30 days of filing.

Fundraising policy
It is the current policy of ARP to not use the services of commercial fundraisers. Several nonprofit organizations are known to spend over 33% of collected donations to pay for fundraising expenditures, and at the time of ARP's foundation, the founders decided paying commercial fundraisers was an unnecessary expense that would detract from the financial efficiency of the organization. ARP instead utilizes a grassroots approach to fundraising, with staff members and volunteers reaching out in their social networks to identify program participants, volunteers, donors, and areas of improvement.

In order to maximize its financial efficiency, ARP does not compensate staff members other than to reimburse them for properly documented out-of-pocket program expenses. ARP reimburses volunteers for mileage at 14 cents per mile, the maximum nontaxable charitable mileage rate authorized by the IRS.

Donations
ARP accepts donations in personal checks by mail and accepts credit card donations either on its website (processed by PayPal) or through volunteers' internet-enabled mobile devices (processed by Bank of America).

Merchandise
Adrenaline Rush Project-branded merchandise generates revenue to help cover program expenses and spreads awareness about the organization and its mission.

References

External links
 Adrenaline Rush Project
 Adrenaline Rush Project (Facebook)
 Richard Petty Driving Experience
 Rusty Wallace Racing Experience
 United States Parachute Association

Non-profit organizations based in California
2012 establishments in California